Between 1898 and 1906, the Arabic periodical aḍ-Ḍiyāʾ (Arabic: Illumination) was published twice a month in Cairo. There are eight year's issues with 24 numbers each (first to third year), resp. 20 numbers each (fourth to eighth year). Its founder and editor in chief was Ibrahīm al-Yāziǧī, a linguist and journalist from Lebanon, who on his readers’ request published aḍ-Ḍiyāʾ in succession to his earlier periodical al-Bayān (1897-1898). As regards content, it had the same agenda as al-Bayān.  The subtitle of the periodical underlines this aspiration: “maǧallat ʿilmīya adabīya ṣaḥīya ṣanāʿīya“ (“a scientific, literary, sanitary and industrial journal”). Alongside countless scientific and literary topics, articles on the development of newspapers in Egypt at that time are also to be found (cf. i. a. 1st year, 1st issue). 

A complete and free available digital version of this journal can be found in the digital collections of the ULB Bonn.

References

Sources
 Dagmar Glaß. (2004). Der al-Muqtaṭaf und seine Öffentlichkeit. Aufklärung, Räsonnement und Meinungsstreit in der frühen arabischen Zeitschriftenkommunikation, Band I+II, Würzburg, pp. 41f., 261, 429.

 

1898 establishments in Egypt
1906 disestablishments in Egypt
Arabic-language magazines
Biweekly magazines published in Egypt
Cultural magazines
Defunct magazines published in Egypt
Magazines established in 1898
Magazines disestablished in 1906
Magazines published in Cairo